Craig Anthony Emerson (born 15 November 1954) is an Australian economist and former Australian Labor Party politician. He served as the Australian House of Representatives Member for the Division of Rankin in Queensland from 1998 until 2013. Emerson also served as Minister for Trade and Competitiveness, Minister for Tertiary Education, Skills, Science and Research and Minister for Competition Policy, Small Business and Consumer Affairs in the Rudd and Gillard Governments.

Early life
Emerson was born in Baradine, New South Wales to Ern and Marge Emerson, and raised as a Roman Catholic. He and his late elder brother, Lance, were subjected to physical and emotional abuse from their mother, Marge. He was intensely religious as a child, finding solace from his turbulent home life, recalling that "Catholicism helped me make sense of Mum's volatile behaviour where there was no sense to be made of it." He earned a bursary to attend St Patrick's College, Strathfield. He later attended the University of Sydney, where he graduated with a Bachelor of Economics (Honours) and a Master of Economics. He also holds a Doctor of Philosophy in Economics from the Australian National University.

Early career 
Early in his career, Emerson variously worked as an economic analyst with the United Nations, an economic adviser to the Minister for Resources and Energy and the Minister for Finance Senator Peter Walsh, an Assistant Secretary of the Department of the Prime Minister and Cabinet, and economic and environmental adviser to Prime Minister Bob Hawke. He became Director-General of the Queensland Department of Environment and Heritage in 1990, where he became embroiled in the Cape Melville affair. He was chief executive officer of the South East Queensland Transit Authority from 1995 to 1996.

Following the defeat of the Goss Government in 1996, Emerson set up a small business partnership, Eco Managers, with former economic adviser to Premier Wayne Goss, Raymond Garrand. They advised various clients on electricity supply issues in Queensland and global petroleum companies on energy policy.

Parliamentary career
Representing the Australian Labor Party, Emerson was elected to the Australian House of Representatives as the Member for Rankin at the 1998 federal election.

Emerson was appointed Shadow Minister for Innovation, Industry, Trade and Tourism from 2001 to 2003, and then Shadow Minister for Workplace Relations and the Public Service from 2003 to 2004. Emerson was relegated to the backbench following the 2004 Australian federal election, having supported Simon Crean and Mark Latham in leadership ballots against the wishes of his Right faction in Queensland. While on the backbench he wrote a book, Vital Signs, Vibrant Society, proposing new economic and social policies for the Federal Parliamentary Labor Party. Following the election of Kevin Rudd as Leader of the Labor Party and Julia Gillard as Deputy Leader in December 2006, Emerson was appointed Shadow Minister for the Service Economy, Small Business and Independent Contractors.

On 3 December 2007, Emerson was named Minister for Small Business, Independent Contractors and the Service Economy and Minister Assisting the Finance Minister on Deregulation in the newly elected Rudd ministry. In June 2009, he was also appointed Minister for Competition Policy and Consumer Affairs.

On 14 September 2010, Emerson was appointed the Minister for Trade, expanded to Minister for Trade and Competitiveness in a ministerial reshuffle announced on 2 March 2012. On 28 October 2012, the Gillard Government released a White paper on Australia in the Asian Century Emerson of which Emerson was the architect. Emerson was assigned the role of Minister Assisting the Prime Minister on Asian Century Policy.

In March 2013, in a further reshuffle of ministerial responsibilities, Emerson gained an additional portfolio as Minister for Tertiary Education, Skills, Science and Research. However, after a leadership change in the federal Australian Labor Party in June 2013 in which Kevin Rudd took over as prime minister from Gillard, Emerson resigned his ministerial portfolios and said he would not contest his seat at the next election. Following the Australian federal election held a few months later in September 2013, Jim Chalmers took over from Emerson as the MP for the seat of Rankin in Queensland.

Post-parliament
After leaving parliament, Emerson established an economic consulting firm, Craig Emerson Economics Pty Ltd. His clients have included Wesfarmers, Coles, AGL Energy, Santos, the BCA, the ACTU and the PNG Government. Emerson is an adviser to KPMG. He was also a regular presenter on Sky News Australia for some years after leaving parliament.

In 2014, Emerson was appointed an Adjunct Professor of Victoria University. He was also a member of the CEDA Council on Economic Policy and Chair of the Advisory Board, Centre for Transformative Innovation, Swinburne University of Technology. Emerson was also President of the Australia China Business Council NSW  and a board member of Obesity Australia.

In February 2018, Emerson's memoir, The Boy from Baradine, was published by Scribe Publications.'

In August 2018, Emerson was involved in public disagreement with Sky News Australia when he resigned in protest as a commentator for the TV network when Sky News broadcast an interview with the right-wing Australian activist Blair Cottrell.  Emerson said that, "My father fought Nazis in World War II and was interred in a German POW camp."  Explaining his decision on Twitter, he said that the decision by Sky News to screen the interview with Cottrell was "another step in a journey to normalising racism and bigotry in our country."

In November 2018, Emerson was appointed Distinguished Fellow at the Australian National University. In March 2019, Emerson was appointed Director of the Australian APEC Study Centre at RMIT University. Emerson is also chair of the McKell Institute.

On the subject of Australia-China relations, Craig Emerson has consistently argued that the poor relationship is partly caused by Australia.

See also
 First Rudd Ministry
 First Gillard Ministry
 Second Gillard Ministry

References

External links

Official website

|-

|-

|-

1954 births
Australian Roman Catholics
Australian Labor Party members of the Parliament of Australia
Labor Right politicians
Australian National University alumni
Government ministers of Australia
Living people
Members of the Australian House of Representatives
Members of the Australian House of Representatives for Rankin
Members of the Cabinet of Australia
People educated at St Patrick's College, Strathfield
University of Sydney alumni
21st-century Australian politicians
20th-century Australian politicians